José Efromovich (born 1955 in La Paz, Bolivia) is a Brazilian businessman of Polish-Jewish descent. He was CEO of the Brazilian airline Avianca Brazil and has a seat in the supervisory board of the AviancaTaca Holding company. His brother is Germán Efromovich, the owner of AviancaTaca. The Efromovich family created the Synergy Group in 2003, an industrial conglomerate in Brazil operating in various business segments. The multinational he heads with his brother has capital invested in companies in the aeronautical, energy, oil, and shipping sectors in several Latin American countries.

References 

1955 births
Living people
Avianca
Bolivian Jews
Bolivian emigrants to Brazil
Bolivian people of Polish-Jewish descent
Brazilian businesspeople
Brazilian chief executives
Brazilian Jews
Brazilian people of Polish-Jewish descent
Brazilian billionaires
People from La Paz